The Jincheng Civil Defense Tunnel is a tunnel in Jincheng Township, Kinmen County, Taiwan.

History
After the first and second Taiwan Strait Crisis, the government decided to construct an underground civilian tunnels for protection. The construction of the tunnel started in March 1968 and completed in June 1969 for 15 months of works. It was then used to connect various public buildings in the island.

Architecture
The tunnel has a total combined length of 2,315 meters. It is equipped with air raid shelters, ammunition depots and pillboxes.

See also
 List of tourist attractions in Taiwan

References

1969 establishments in Taiwan
Civil defense
Jincheng Township
Military history of Taiwan
Tunnels completed in 1969
Tunnels in Kinmen County
Tunnel warfare